Cheilosia fasciata is a European  species of hoverfly. Like most Cheilosia it is mostly black,

Cheilosia semifasciata (Becker, 1894) is often misidentified as Cheilosia fasciata.

Distribution
It is widespread in Europe, but absent from Great Britain.

Biology
It is usually found in association with ramsons (Allium ursinum).

References

Diptera of Europe
Eristalinae
Insects described in 1853